Dapaah is a surname. Notable people with the surname include:

Bernice Dapaah, Ghanaian businesswoman
Cecilia Dapaah (born 1954), Ghanaian politician
Esther Obeng Dapaah (born 1945), Ghanaian politician and lawyer
Michael Dapaah (born 1991), British actor, rapper, and comedian

See also
Albert Kan-Dapaah (born 1953), Ghanaian accountant and politician